Ziguinchor is the capital of the Ziguinchor Region, and the chief town of the Casamance area of Senegal, lying at the mouth of the Casamance River. It has a population of over 230,000 (2007 estimate). It is the seventh largest city of Senegal, but largely separated from the north of the country by The Gambia.

Etymology
There are several competing etymologies for Ziguinchor's name. The most well-known comes from the time when Portuguese traders and explorers came to the region to form a trading post, and derives from Portuguese Cheguei e choram, "I came and they cry".  The local people, seeing the Europeans, began crying, thinking they were about to be enslaved. The name, however, likely predates the Portuguese arrival, as the earliest sources mention the Bainuk of Ezigichor. The term may come from the Bainuk language words "asi nin core," meaning "places to go are finished," relating to the end of the Bainuk migrations in their traditional history. It could also come from "ji gi cor," meaning "place of several fields."

History

The first European settlement in the area was founded by the Portuguese in 1645. The Portuguese objective was to form a trading post and a friendship alliance with the local king. The Portuguese objective was trade with the king of Casa (the Casa mansa or king), a loyal friend, described by chroniclers as the mostly friendly kingship towards the Portuguese along the Guinean coast. The king started to live in European manner, with table, chairs and western clothing and, in the court, there were several Portuguese merchants. One of the commodities for trade were slaves, and Ziguinchor became a slave port during much of the Portuguese rule.

The spot was not chosen at random. While a Jola village predated the town, it was situated to trade with the Jola kingdom of Kasso, which dates back to the Mali Empire, when Mandinke people moved into the area from the south and east.

Following the end of the slave trade, Portuguese commerce stultified, and the town was eventually handed over to France on 22 April 1888, in a deal brokered amongst the colonial powers at the Berlin conference of 1886.

Under the French, Ziguinchor became a major trade port, mostly due to the intensive groundnut cultivation the colonial government encouraged in the interior. By 1900, the area was largely converted to Christianity, although significant Syncretist and Muslim communities flourish.

Rice growing, the traditional crop of the region, was hurt by the push to cultivate groundnuts, and extensive forest areas were cleared.  The French government also imported rice across West Africa from the intensive farming they encouraged in French Indochina, shrinking the market for Casamance's main produce.

After independence, the city saw its economic growth slow, in part due to the War of Independence in neighboring Guinea-Bissau.  Portuguese military crossed into the area at least once, pursuing PAIG rebels, and cannon fire could be heard in the city for much of the war. During this period Ziguinchor became a main post for both the Senegalese Army and French forces, guarding the frontier; a frontier which cut in two Diola families and communities.

As the capital of Casamance, Ziguinchor has been at the center of a three-decade-long conflict with Dakar that has flared into open civil war on more than one occasion. With a population with a majority of Diola and Christian, the effects of a large migration of Wolof Muslims fleeing drought in the north during the 1970s caused tensions to flare. A 1983 demonstration against price rises in Ziguinchor Market was put down violently by Senegalese forces, and an insurgency by the Movement of Democratic Forces of Casamance (MFDC) followed, effectively wrecking the economy of the region.  The 2004 peace accords, signed in Ziguinchor, were hoped to be the end of the violence, but in 2006, sporadic fighting by an MFDC split and laying of land mines again erupted in rural areas nearby.

Economy

Ziguinchor remains economically dependent on its role as a cargo port, transport hub and ferry terminal.  The "Nationale 4" highway crosses the Casamance River just east of the city, linking the region with Bignona about 25 km to the north, and (via The Gambia), the rest of Senegal.

A vibrant tourist destination, the beaches of nearby Cap Skirring were discovered by foreign tourists in the 1960s, and the location was built up to become one of the first Club Med resorts. Ziguinchor region is also known for growing great quantities of rice, oranges, mangoes, bananas, cashews, tropical fruits and vegetables, fish, and prawns, much of which are processed locally and exported from the city, its port, and its airport. It is also home to a large peanut oil factory.

Transport

The MV Joola, which sank in 2002, was sailing from Ziguinchor to Dakar. The loss of the ferry, which was not replaced until 2005, cut the main link between Casamance and the rest of the country. The new ferry, which began regular runs in 2007, is named for local anti-colonial martyr Aline Sitoe Diatta, and promises a boost to the local economy.

The city has an airport, Ziguinchor Airport.

Architecture 
A number of buildings in the town have classified by government decree as historic, the cemetery and several government buildings, like the Ziguinchor Regional Council.

Places of worship 

Among the places of worship, they are predominantly Christian churches and temples: Roman Catholic Diocese of Ziguinchor (Catholic Church), Assemblies of God, Universal Church of the Kingdom of God. There are also Muslim mosques.

Demography
Ziguinchor is a melting pot of all the ethnic groups co-existing in Senegal: Mandinka, Jola, Wolof, Fula/Halpulaar, Mancagne, Manjack, Soninke, Serer, Bainounck, Balanta and Creole.  Jola have been the majority of the population in the region since at least 1500, and culturally share much with the people of Guinea-Bissau.  One of three dialects of Guinea-Bissau Creole, Cacheu–Ziguinchor, is centered around the city.  Resistant to first Islam and later Christianity, many Jola retain a degree of animist practices, while Basse Casamance is the only majority Catholic area in Senegal.

Notable natives and residents
Ziguinchor is the birthplace of some famous Senegalese writers and filmmakers (Sembene Ousmane), artists (Doura Mane, Bouly Sonko, Ousmane Sow Huchard "Soleya Mama", the Tourekunda brothers), sportsmen (Jules Francois Bocande, Bassirou NDiaye, Lansana Coly, Basile de Carvalho) and TikToker (Khabane Lame).

Climate
Ziguinchor has a tropical savanna climate (Köppen Aw). It has hot, rainless winters and warm, very wet summers.

Administration

In the decades following independence, Ziguinchor was a stronghold of the Socialist Party of Senegal (PS). Robert Sagna, a long-time minister in Socialist Party governments, was also Mayor of Ziguinchor from 1984 to 2009.  In the beginning of 2007 Sagna left the PS and led the Taku Défaraat Sénégal coalition in a failed presidential bid. In 2001's legislative elections, a big push by President Abdoulaye Wade's ruling PDS party, spearheading the Sopi coalition (joined in 2008 by And-Jëf/Pads), was led by Ziguinchor politician Abdoulaye Baldé, a former General Secretary to the President.  In the 2001 elections, the a Ziguinchor National Assembly seat was gained by the PDS, and held again in 2007, prompting speculation that Sagna and his party's days of dominating local politics were numbered.  Sagna, though, won a legislative seat on proportional representation in 2007, and continued in both offices until 2009. The Sopi Coalition won the March 2009 local election in Ziguinchor, and Baldé was elected Mayor.

Africa Cup of Nations

Ziguinchor was one of the venues for the 1992 Africa Cup of Nations football championship. The city Sports and Arts Associations conceived for the first time the concept of having specific suburbs barracking for each national team in order to give a vibrant and joyful atmosphere to the Football tournament that saw Algeria, Côte d'Ivoire, Ghana, Zambia, Egypt, Congo play the first half of the Championship in that city. This successful and original experience inspired other tournament organisers from then on. Mali hosting the 2002 Africa Cup of Nations used the same concept through the famous Ndiatiguiya, (having specific suburbs barracking for a specific team throughout the tournament), and then Korea/Japan during the 2002 World Cup used the same concept as well.

Education
École française François-Rabelais, a French international school serving maternelle (preschool) through collège, is in Ziguinchor.

Ziguinchor University was founded in 2007.

Sister cities
Ziguinchor has a sister city, as designated by Sister Cities International:
 Tite Region, Guinea-Bissau
 Prince George's County, Maryland, United States
: Saint-Maur-des-Fossés

References

Much of this article was translated from the French language Wikipedia article :fr:Ziguinchor.
Ferdinand de Jong. Politicians of the Sacred Grove: Citizenship and Ethnicity in Southern Senegal. Africa: Journal of the International African Institute, Vol. 72, No. 2 (2002), pp. 203–220 On the political and cultural tactics of longtime mayor Robert Sagna.

Further reading
 Jean-Claude Bruneau, Université de Bordeaux III, 1975, 409 p. (Thèse de 3rd cycle)
 Jean-Claude Bruneau, Talence, Ministère des universités, CNRS, Centre d'études de géographie tropicale, 1979
 Nfally Diedhiou, Dakar, Université Cheikh Anta Diop, 2000, 119 p. + annexes, (Mémoire de Maîtrise)
 Maguette Diop, Université de Dakar, 1977 (Mémoire de Maîtrise)
 Baudouin Duquesne, Sénégal, 1986
 Mamadou Goudiaby, Dakar, Université Cheikh Anta Diop, 2001, 51 p. (Mémoire de DEA)
 Caroline Juillard, Paris, CNRS, 1995
 Mamadou Goudiaby, Dakar, Université Cheikh Anta Diop, 2001, 51 p. (Mémoire de DEA)
 Jacqueline Trincaz, Paris, L'Harmattan, 1981, VIII + 360 p. (Thèse de 3rd cycle publiée)
 Pierre-Xavier Trincaz, Paris, Université de Paris V, 1979 (Thèse de 3rd cycle publiée en 1984, Colonisation et Régionalisme. Ziguinchor en Casamance, Paris, ORSTOM, 270 p.

External links

 Mayor of Ziguinchor's statistics at the International Association for Francophone Mayors.
 Centre culturel régional de Ziguinchor, Ministère de la Culture, du Patrimoine historique classé, des Langues nationales et de la Francophonie, Senegal.
 Video of Ziguinchor 2017 Documentary about Ziguinchor and Nella Star, a Dutch anthropologist, revisiting Ziguinchor after 44 years to bring back memories.

 
Casamance
Casamance River
Regional capitals in Senegal
French West Africa
Former Portuguese colonies
Communes of Senegal
Populated places in the Ziguinchor Department